

G02A Uterotonics

G02AB Ergot alkaloids
G02AB01 Methylergometrine
G02AB02 Ergot alkaloids
G02AB03 Ergometrine
QG02AB53 Ergometrine, combinations

G02AC Ergot alkaloids and oxytocin including analogues, in combination
G02AC01 Methylergometrine and oxytocin
QG02AC90 Ergometrine and oxytocin

G02AD Prostaglandins
G02AD01 Dinoprost
G02AD02 Dinoprostone
G02AD03 Gemeprost
G02AD04 Carboprost
G02AD05 Sulprostone
G02AD06 Misoprostol
QG02AD90 Cloprostenol
QG02AD91 Luprostiol
QG02AD92 Fenprostalene
QG02AD93 Tiaprost
QG02AD94 Alfaprostol
QG02AD95 Etiproston

G02AX Other uterotonics

G02B Contraceptives for topical use

G02BA Intrauterine contraceptives
G02BA01 Plastic IUD
G02BA02 Plastic IUD with copper
G02BA03 Plastic IUD with progestogen

G02BB Intravaginal contraceptives
G02BB01 Vaginal ring with progestogen and estrogen
G02BB02 Vaginal ring with progestogen

G02C Other gynecologicals

G02CA Sympathomimetics, labour repressants
G02CA01 Ritodrine
G02CA02 Buphenine
G02CA03 Fenoterol
QG02CA90 Vetrabutin
QG02CA91 Clenbuterol

G02CB Prolactin inhibitors
G02CB01 Bromocriptine
G02CB02 Lisuride
G02CB03 Cabergoline
G02CB04 Quinagolide
G02CB05 Metergoline
G02CB06 Terguride

G02CC Anti-inflammatory products for vaginal administration
G02CC01 Ibuprofen
G02CC02 Naproxen
G02CC03 Benzydamine
G02CC04 Flunoxaprofen

G02CX Other gynecologicals
G02CX01 Atosiban
G02CX02 Flibanserin
G02CX03 Agni casti fructus
G02CX04 Cimicifugae rhizoma
G02CX05 Bremelanotide
G02CX06 Fezolinetant
QG02CX90 Denaverine
QG02CX91 Lotrifen

References

G02